Klytaemnestra may refer to:

 An alternative spelling of Clytemnestra, wife of Agamemnon in Greek mythology
 179 Klytaemnestra, asteroid
 Klytaemnestra family, asteroid family